Mike Casey may refer to:

Mike Casey (labor leader) (born 1958), American labor leader from California
Mike Casey (basketball) (1948–2009), American basketball player who played at the University of Kentucky
Mike Casey (hurler) (born 1995), Irish hurler

See also
Michael Casey (disambiguation)